Yara Mustafa (born 20 October 2001) is a Jordanian actress and singer known for her role as Dina on Netflix mini series AIRawabi School for Girls.

Biography
Mustafa was born in Saudi Arabia, and has also lived in Kuwait and Jordan. Mustafa nurtured a passion for acting since a young age, gaining experience from musical theatre. She has also trained as a soprano singer. In 2021, Mustafa made her on screen debut in the Jordanian Netflix series Al-Rawabi School For Girls. Her castmates have said that even if people think she resembles like Dina, she is nothing like Dina in real life. She did a cover of Summertime Sadness, by Lana Del Rey, with her castmate Joanna Arida.

Credits 
 AlRawabi School for Girls (2021)

References

External links

 

2001 births
Living people
Jordanian actresses
Jordanian film actresses
Jordanian television actresses